The AAA Americas Heavyweight Championship is a former championship contested for in the Mexican lucha libre promotion AAA, it was promoted as a secondary title to AAA's main "World" title. Being a professional wrestling championship it is not won legitimately; it is instead won via a scripted ending to a match or awarded to a wrestler because of a storyline. Konnan was the first AAA Americas Heavyweight champion, a title he won by defeating the Killer at the end of a tournament. The title was originally intended to be the top heavyweight title in AAA but when Konnan left the promotion in 1996 to work exclusively for World Championship Wrestling (WCW) and took the championship belt with him the title was quietly ignored by AAA.  Initially when Konnan joined WCW he would wear the Americas title with the commentators referring to it as "the Mexican Championship" but the belt was the AAA Americas title. The belt remained in Konnan's possession until he started working with AAA again around 2004, where he turned over the belt. Sangre Chicana became the second AAA Americas Heavyweight Champion after winning a tournament for the title in 2004, defeating Latin Lover. By 2006 Sangre Chicana went into semi-retirement and stopped working for AAA all together, when Sangre Chicana left AAA the title was once again quietly dropped.

Title history

Footnotes

References

Lucha Libre AAA Worldwide championships